Abdul Moosabhoy Ismail (born 20 August 1945) is a former Indian first-class cricketer who later became a selector for the Mumbai Cricket Association. Ismail played as a swing bowler for Bombay cricket team from 1969/70 to 1977/78.

Career
A right-arm fast-medium bowler, Ismail played for Bombay between the 1969/70 and 1977/78 seasons. In his first match of the 1971–72 Ranji Trophy against Gujarat, Ismail had figures of 3/15 and 6/16, giving his team an innings win within two days. Later that season, Bombay registered a 284-run win in away game against Baroda, with Ismail taking 4/18 and 5/62, with Baroda being bowled out for 42 in their first innings. He finished the 1971/72 season with 56 wickets at an average of 13.98.

He found success in the 1975–76 Ranji Trophy in which he finished as the leading wicket-taker with 38 scalps at an average of 16. In the final of that Ranji season against Bihar, he took 5/48 and 5/58, helping his team to a 10-wicket victory.

In 2000, Ismail became a member of the Mumbai Cricket Association the Ranji and under-22 selection panel. He worked in that position for many years.

Playing style
Ismail was a right-arm fast-medium new ball bowler with a "deceptive action", who could swing the ball both ways. About Ismail's bowling, former Mumbai captain Milind Rege said, "I found his action very awkward, completely open-chested, something like Colin Croft. He had the biggest outswing I have ever seen. He started from around the leg stump and the swing would finish at 1st slip. [...] Surely Abdul was a great bowler who should have played many a Test [...]"

According to former India cricketer Brijesh Patel, "Ismail was a very good bowler deceptive with his weird action. With both his swings, he made the batsmen play. Mind you, the quality of balls used was poor those days and it would lose its shine, but Abdul would be at you all the time. He should have played for the country."

Personal life
Ismail, son of a taxi driver, was supported to play cricket by a Kerkar family. Ismail says of his early life, "What I am today is because of the Kerkar family. They really took care of me. We had no money. My father was the only earning member and he used to get annoyed seeing me on the ground. Everyday I would go to banks and offices and beg for a job."

Ismail's son Asif Ismail is a tennis player who has appeared in Davis Cup.

References

External links 
 
 

1945 births
Living people
Indian cricketers
Mumbai cricketers
West Zone cricketers
Cricketers from Mumbai